Gyalolechia is a genus of fungi belonging to the family Teloschistaceae.

The genus was first described by Abramo Bartolommeo Massalongo in 1852.

Species include:
 Gyalolechia bracteata
 Gyalolechia flavorubescens
 Gyalolechia fulgens

References

Teloschistales
Taxa named by Abramo Bartolommeo Massalongo
Taxa described in 1852
Teloschistales genera